James Cecil, 5th Earl of Salisbury (8 June 1691 – 9 October 1728), known as Viscount Cranborne from 1691 to 1694, was a British nobleman, politician, and peer. Salisbury was the son of James Cecil, 4th Earl of Salisbury, and Frances Bennett, and succeeded his father in the earldom in 1694. From 1712 to 1714 he served as Lord Lieutenant of Hertfordshire.

Lord Salisbury married Lady Anne Tufton, daughter of Thomas Tufton, 6th Earl of Thanet, on 12 February 1709. They had four children:

James Cecil, 6th Earl of Salisbury (1713–1780)
Catherine Cecil (c. 1722–1752), married John Perceval, 2nd Earl of Egmont and had issue.
Anne Cecil (c. 1728–1752)
Margaret Cecil (died 1752) died, unmarried, of smallpox, at the Earl of Egmont's in Pall-Mall.

Lord Salisbury died in October 1728, aged 37, and was succeeded in his titles by his son James.

Lady Salisbury died in 1756. The Countess Anne school in Hatfield, founded in 1735, is named after her.

Notes

References 
 
 

1691 births
1728 deaths
James Cecil, 5th Earl of Salisbury
James
Lord-Lieutenants of Hertfordshire